Fred Herbert Colvin (1867–1965) was an American machinist, technical journalist, author, and editor. He wrote, co-wrote, edited, or co-edited many periodical articles, handbooks, and textbooks related to engineering, machining, and manufacturing. His autobiography, Sixty Years with Men and Machines, provides a thorough and colloquial look into the decades of 1880 to 1950, giving insight into the culture of the Machine Age.

Overview of career
Over the years, Colvin worked on both Alexander Luchars's journal Machinery (of which he was chief editor from its beginning in 1894 until 1897) and John A. Hill's journal American Machinist (which he worked on from 1907 until retirement in 1937, having been co-editor for many years). He came to the Hill Publishing Company (soon to become McGraw-Hill) in 1907 to work on the American Machinist, and in the subsequent decades, besides his work on the journal, he authored or coauthored dozens of McGraw-Hill monographs, textbooks, and reference books in the field of machining. His principal coauthor was Frank A. Stanley; their first book series together was the "Hill Kink Books" series of 1908, a collection of handy, practical advice for the machinist on the shop floor. (The word "kinks" in this context was used in the sense of "tips and tricks"; that sense of the word is rather obsolescent today and merits glossing.)

From 1908 to 1945, Colvin and Stanley coedited eight editions of American Machinists' Handbook, a McGraw-Hill reference book similar to Industrial Press's Machinery's Handbook. (The latter title, still in print and regularly revised, is the one that machinists today are usually referring to when they speak imprecisely of "the machinist's handbook" or "the machinists' handbook".)

Colvin was retired and in his 70s when World War II started, but he came out of retirement in order to help with the war production effort.

Colvin was the 1942 recipient of the Worcester Reed Warner Medal. In 1944 the Stevens Institute of Technology awarded him an honorary M.E. degree for his life's work in advancing the field.

Near the end of his life, Colvin worked on a history of the American machine tool industry, but he died before finishing.

Memoir, poetry, and labor-relations titles by Colvin

Memoir

Poetry

Labor-relations monographs

Bibliography

References

External links
 
 
 Fred H. Colvin Collection, Department of Special Collections, Case Western Reserve University Library, Cleveland, Ohio, US
 Books authored or coauthored by Colvin—Library of Congress catalog

1867 births
1965 deaths
American book editors
Machinists
Stevens Institute of Technology alumni